Niek Schiks (born 3 February 2004) is a Dutch professional footballer who plays as a goalkeeper for Jong PSV in the Eerste Divisie.

Early life
Born in Boxmeer, Schiks was from a family of footballers with his dad Oscar and brother Tijn playing with JVC Cuijk. He joined PSV academy at the age of eight and stayed through the academy travelling to a secondary school for top athletes in Eindhoven to help him to combine study and training. He signed his first professional contract with PSV aged 17.

Career
Schiks made his debut in the Eerste Divisie for Jong PSV against TOP Oss on 6 September 2022.
 Schiks said he embraced the pressure of starting matches as a goalkeeper and appreciated the opportunities given at the club to learn how to be a professional.

References

External links
 

Living people
2004 births
Dutch footballers
Eerste Divisie players
Jong PSV players
Association football goalkeepers
People from Boxmeer